is a Japanese actress. One of her major roles was that of Tsuyoshi, the protagonist of Sh15uya.

TV series
 Hatsu Kare (2006)
 Dance Drill (2006)
 Machiben (2006)
 Gachi Baka (2006)
 Sh15uya (2005)

Films
Ao Zora No Yukue~Way Of Blue Sky (http://www.aozoranoyukue.com) (2005)

External links
Official site

References 

Living people
Year of birth missing (living people)